The Neurologist is a peer-reviewed medical journal, which publishes articles related to neurological diseases, with a focus on clinical aspects.

See also
 Journal of Neurology, Neurosurgery, and Psychiatry

References
 

Neurology journals
Publications with year of establishment missing
Lippincott Williams & Wilkins academic journals
Bimonthly journals